The 2021–22 St. John's Red Storm men's basketball team represented St. John's University during the 2021–22 NCAA Division I men's basketball season. They were coached by Mike Anderson, in his third year at the school, and played their home games at Carnesecca Arena and Madison Square Garden as members of the Big East Conference.

Previous season
The Red Storm finished the season 16–11, 10–9 in Big East play to finish in a tie for fourth place. As the No. 4 seed in the Big East tournament, they lost to Seton Hall in the quarterfinals.

Offseason

Departures

Incoming transfers

2021 recruiting class

2022 Recruiting class

Roster

Schedule and results

|-
!colspan=12 style=| Exhibition

|-
!colspan=12 style=| Non-conference regular season

|-
!colspan=12 style=| Big East regular season

|-
!colspan=12 style=|Big East tournament

Rankings

Awards and honors

Big East Conference honors

All-Big East First Team
Julian Champagnie

All-Big East Honorable Mention
Posh Alexander

Source

References

St. John's
St. John's Red Storm men's basketball seasons
Saint John's